The 1975 Alabama Crimson Tide football team (variously "Alabama", "UA" or "Bama") represented the University of Alabama in the 1975 NCAA Division I football season. It was the Crimson Tide's 81st overall and 42nd season as a member of the Southeastern Conference (SEC). The team was led by head coach Bear Bryant, in his 18th year, and played their home games at Denny Stadium in Tuscaloosa and Legion Field in Birmingham, Alabama. They finished season with eleven wins and one loss (11–1 overall, 6–0 in the SEC), as SEC champions and with a victory over Penn State in the Sugar Bowl.

The 1975 squad entered the season with the No. 2 ranking in the AP Poll and as one of the favorites to compete for the national championship. Their championship hopes were dashed after they were upset by an unranked Missouri team in their season opener at Legion Field. Although Alabama dropped into the No. 14 position prior to their second game against Clemson, they would not lose another game during the season as they climbed up the polls back into a top five position by season's end.

After their shutout over Clemson, Alabama traveled to Nashville in the first road game of the season where they defeated Vanderbilt. The Crimson Tide then returned to Birmingham and defeated Ole Miss the week before their victory over Washington in the first meeting between the schools since the 1926 Rose Bowl. They followed this with wins over Tennessee, TCU, Mississippi State, LSU and Southern Miss on homecoming in Tuscaloosa. The Crimson  Tide then closed the season with wins against Auburn in what was Ralph Jordan's final game as the Tigers' head coach and Penn State in the Sugar Bowl that ended an eight-game winless streak  in bowl games, and started a bowl winning streak that went six years.

Schedule

Roster

Game summaries

Missouri

Sources:

As they entered their first game of the 1975 season, Alabama was ranked as the nations No. 2 team prior to their Monday night game against Missouri. Before a nationally televised audience, the Crimson Tide fell behind to the Tigers 20–0 at halftime and were ultimately defeated 20–7 in the first major upset of the season. The loss brought Alabama's record against Missouri to 0–2 up to that point in time.

Clemson

Sources:

After their loss against Missouri, the Crimson Tide had a bye prior their game against Clemson, and entered the contest as the No. 14 team prior to their game against the Tigers. At Denny Stadium, Alabama ran for 437 yards and eight touchdowns in this 56–0 shutout of Clemson. The victory improved Alabama's all-time record against Clemson to 11–3.

Vanderbilt

Sources:

After their victory over Clemson, Alabama moved into the No. 11 position in the AP Poll prior to their game against Vanderbilt. In their first road game of the season, the Crimson Tide score on their first four possession en route to a 40–7 victory over the Commodores at Nashville. The victory improved Alabama's all-time record against Vanderbilt to 32–17–4.

Ole Miss

Sources:

After their victory over Vanderbilt, Alabama moved into the No. 9 position in the AP Poll prior to their game against Ole Miss at Legion Field. Against the Rebels, the Crimson Tide scored twice in a 0:44 span early in the game en route to a 32–6 victory at Birmingham. The victory improved Alabama's all-time record against Ole Miss to 24–5–2.

Washington

Sources:

After their victory over Ole Miss, Alabama moved into the No. 7 position in the AP Poll prior to their non-conference game against Washington. Playing the Huskies for the first time since the 1926 Rose Bowl, Alabama had 496 yards of total offense and seven touchdowns in this 52–0 shutout of Washington. The victory improved Alabama's all-time record against Washington to 2–0.

Tennessee

Sources:

After their blowout victory over Washington, Alabama moved into the No. 6 position prior to their game against Tennessee. Against the Volunteers, Richard Todd ran for three and threw for a fourth touchdown in this 30–7 victory at Legion Field. The victory improved Alabama's all-time record against Tennessee to 28–23–7.

TCU

Sources:

After their victory over Tennessee, Alabama retained their No. 6 position prior to their match-up against Texas Christian University (TCU) of the Southwest Conference at Legion Field. Against the Horned Frogs, Alabama posted its third shutout of the season with this 45–0 victory over TCU. The victory improved Alabama's all-time record against TCU to 2–3.

Mississippi State

Sources:

As they entered their game against Mississippi State, Alabama retained their No. 6 position in the AP Poll. At Jackson, the Crimson Tide overcame a 10–7 halftime deficit and came-from-behind and defeated the Bulldogs 21–10. The victory improved Alabama's all-time record against Mississippi State to 47–10–3.

LSU

Sources:

After their victory over Mississippi State, Alabama moved into the No. 5 position in the AP Poll prior to their game against LSU. With this 23–10 victory over the rival Tigers, the Crimson Tide secured the 1975 conference championship. The victory improved Alabama's all-time record against LSU to 25–10–4.

Southern Miss

Sources:

After they clinched the conference championship with their victory over LSU, Alabama retained the No. 5 position of the AP Poll prior to their game against Southern Miss. On homecoming against the Golden Eagles, the Crimson Tide captured the 600th win in school history with this 27–6 win at Denny Stadium. The victory improved Alabama's all-time record against Southern Miss to 15–2–1.

Auburn

Sources:

As they entered the annual Iron Bowl, Alabama moved into the No. 4 position in the AP Poll prior to their match-up at Legion Field. In what was the final game ever coached by Ralph Jordan as the head coach of the Tigers, the Crimson Tide were victorious with this 28–0 shutout at Birmingham. The victory improved Alabama's all-time record against Auburn to 22–17–1.

Penn State

Sources:

Playing the first Sugar Bowl at the Louisiana Superdome, Alabama defeated the Penn State Nittany Lions 13–6 and ended a seven-game bowl losing streak in the process. The victory improved Alabama's all-time record against Penn State to 1–1.

NFL Draft
Several players that were varsity lettermen from the 1975 squad were drafted into the National Football League (NFL) in the 1976, 1977 and 1978 drafts. These players included:

References
General

 
 

Specific

Alabama
Alabama Crimson Tide football seasons
Southeastern Conference football champion seasons
Sugar Bowl champion seasons
Alabama Crimson Tide football